This is a list of terrorist incidents in Pakistan in 2014.

January – March 

 1 January — A bomb blasted on the Qambrani road in Akhtarabad, Quetta near a bus, which was carrying at least 50 pilgrims from Iran to Pakistan. Police confirmed that three of the passengers are killed and at least twenty-four injured.
 6 January - A student Aitzaz Hasan prevent a suicide bomber from entering his school at Hangu village.
 9 January - A car suicide-bomb was blasted by Tehrik-i-Taliban Pakistan near the car of a senior police officer Chaudhry Aslam Khan, in which Khan was killed with two others.
 19 January - 
 13 people including five security personnel were killed and 29 others injured after a suicide bomber exploded himself at R.A Bazar in Rawalpindi.
 2014 Bannu bombing
 21 January - 2014 Mastung bus bombing
 2 February - 2014 Peshawar cinema bombings
 9 February - 8 people killed and 8 injured in a grenade attack, followed by a shooting, on a gathering at a Sufi shrine in Karachi.
 1 March — A bomb killed at least 11 people and another 10 injured in Federally Administered Tribal Areas.
 3 March - An attack at the district court in sector F-8 in Islamabad killed at least 11 people. Several gunmen attacked the court's premises and detonated two explosive devices (possibly one suicide bomber). Responsibility for the attack was claimed by a splinter group of the Tehreek-i-Taliban Pakistan, called Ahrarul Hind.

April – August 

 8 April - At least 16 people were killed when militants detonated an IED on a train at Sibi railway station. The separatist United Baloch Army claimed responsibility for the attack.
 9 April - At least 24 people were killed when militants detonated an explosive device at a vegetable market in sector I-11 in Islamabad. The separatist United Baloch Army claimed responsibility for the attack.
 8 June - At least 24 people were killed when militants attacked a Bus carrying Shia pilgrims from Iran to Quetta in Balochistan province of Pakistan.
 8 June — Jinnah International Airport attack
 At least 30 people were killed when terrorists attacked Jinnah International Airport in Karachi on the night of June 8. The 10 Militants were killed in a combat that lasted for 5 hours.
 11 June — Tirah air strike
  At least 25 suspected militants were killed and 15 injured when military planes bombed their hideouts in Tirah valley of Khyber Agency
 11 June — Five killed in separate clashes near Swat Valley
 In the first incident, unidentified men fired at a car in the Kooza Bandi village of Swat Valley, killing three people including a police guard.
In a separate incident, up to six militants stormed a checkpoint in the northwestern town of Dargai, that lies in the Malakand region neighbouring Swat. Two Levies personnel were killed in the attack, Express News reported.
15 August 2014- 2014 Quetta Airbase attack, 12 Militants, and 11 persons injured after a failed attack on PAF bases in Quetta

September - December 

 6 September - Pakistani Navy frigate PNS Zulfiquar was attacked and briefly captured by al-Qaeda and rogue Pakistani Navy officers before being recaptured by Pakistani forces. The attack was intended to use the Zulfiquar's anti ship missiles to attack the U.S. Navy fleet in the Arabian Sea. 10 militants which including 4 rogue Pakistani navy officers were killed in ensuing operation to recapture the ship. One rogue officer detonated a suicide bomb inside the ship after being surrounded. 4 other officers who were involved but who did not participate in the attack were later apprehended.
 2 November - 2014 Wagah border suicide attack: An attack on the Wagah Border, close to the Pakistani city of Lahore and the Indian city of Amritsar killed more than 60 people with more than 110 injured. There were no initial claims of responsibility.
 7 November At least 6 people were killed and 4 wounded in two explosion in Mohmand Agency.
 16 December 2014 Peshawar school massacre: At least 132 children among over 141 killed by Taliban militants who stormed an army-run school in Peshawar city. Seven militants were also killed during the SSG rescue operation 
 18 December At least 3 paramilitary soldiers die in roadside bomb in Bajaur Agency, Federally Administered Tribal Areas

References 

 
2014 in Pakistan
2014